In enzymology, a chondroitin 4-sulfotransferase is an enzyme that catalyzes the chemical reaction

3'-phosphoadenosine-5'-phosphosulfate + chondroitin  adenosine 3',5'-bisphosphate + chondroitin 4'-sulfate

Thus, the two substrates of this enzyme are 3'-phosphoadenylyl sulfate and chondroitin, whereas its two products are adenosine 3',5'-bisphosphate and chondroitin 4'-sulfate.

This enzyme belongs to the family of transferases, to be specific, the sulfotransferases, which transfer sulfur-containing groups.  The systematic name of this enzyme class is 3'-phosphoadenylyl-sulfate:chondroitin 4'-sulfotransferase. This enzyme is also called chondroitin sulfotransferase.  This enzyme participates in 3 metabolic pathways: chondroitin sulfate biosynthesis, sulfur metabolism, and the biosynthesis of glycan structures.

References

 
 
 
 
 
 

EC 2.8.2
Enzymes of unknown structure